The 1927 Kentucky gubernatorial election was held on November 8, 1927. Republican nominee Flem D. Sampson defeated Democratic nominee J. C. W. Beckham with 52.09% of the vote.

Primary elections
Primary elections were held on August 6, 1927.

Democratic primary

Candidates
J. C. W. Beckham, former United States Senator and governor
Robert T. Crowe, former Speaker of the Kentucky House of Representatives

Results

Republican primary

Candidates
Flem D. Sampson, former Chief Justice of the Kentucky Court of Appeals
Robert H. Lucas, Kentucky Internal Revenue Collector

Results

General election

Candidates
Flem D. Sampson, Republican 
J. C. W. Beckham, Democratic

Results

References

1927
Kentucky
1927 Kentucky elections